Southampton Test is a constituency represented in the House of Commons of the UK Parliament since 1997 by Alan Whitehead, a member of the Labour Party.

History
The constituency was created for the 1950 general election, when the previous two-member Southampton constituency was abolished. The boundaries of the seat have changed at most of the Boundary Commissions' periodic reviews.

Horace King, after being the member in the first half of the 1950s, would later become the first Speaker of the House of Commons from the Labour Party.

Southampton Test proved to be a bellwether (mirroring the national result) from 1966 until 2010, with the exception of the minority government of Harold Wilson from February to October 1974 .

Whitehead for Labour performed better here than John Denham in Southampton Itchen, the other Southampton seat, which the party also held in the 2010 general election.  The area from 2010 to 2015 was one of four Labour seats in South East England and since 2017 is among two of eighteen in Hampshire won by Labour candidates. Whitehead was elected in 2017 with a majority of over 10,000 votes, and in 2019 over 6,000, making Southampton Test a relatively comfortable Labour seat.

Constituency profile
The seat covers the western part of the City of Southampton and is named after the River Test, one of the city's two rivers. It covers some of the leafy northern suburbs (though the northernmost Bassett Ward ceased to form part of the constituency in 1997) and the western port areas as well as the social housing estates of the western fringes. It is traditionally the marginally more affluent of the two constituencies in the city, before 2010 having a higher number of Tory representatives than its neighbour Southampton Itchen — named after the other major river.  The area includes the University of Southampton, though its halls of residence fall almost entirely within Romsey and Southampton North or Southampton Itchen.
Workless claimants, registered jobseekers, were in November 2012 close to but slightly below than the national average of 3.8%, at 3.4% of the population based on a statistical compilation by The Guardian, above the average for the South East seats of 2.5% but below, for example, five seats in East Kent.

The seat is home to Southampton FC's football ground at St Mary's.

Boundaries 

1950–1955: The County Borough of Southampton wards of All Saints, Banister, Freemantle, Millbrook, St Nicholas, Shirley, and Town; and the (civil) Parish of Millbrook (which was then in the Romsey and Stockbridge Rural District).

1955–1983: The County Borough of Southampton wards of Banister, Bargate, Bassett, Coxford, Freemantle, Millbrook, Portswood, Redbridge, and Shirley.

1983–1997: The City of Southampton wards of Bassett, Coxford, Freemantle, Millbrook, Portswood, Redbridge, and Shirley.

1997–2010: The City of Southampton wards of Coxford, Freemantle, Millbrook, Portswood, Redbridge, St Luke's, and Shirley.

2010–present: The City of Southampton wards of Bevois, Coxford, Freemantle, Millbrook, Portswood, Redbridge, and Shirley.

The constituency is bounded to the east by Southampton Itchen, to the north by Romsey and Southampton North and to the west by New Forest East.

Members of Parliament

Elections

Elections in the 2010s

Elections in the 2000s

Elections in the 1990s

Elections in the 1980s

Elections in the 1970s

Elections in the 1960s

Elections in the 1950s

See also 
 List of parliamentary constituencies in Hampshire

Notes

References

Parliamentary constituencies in Hampshire
Constituencies of the Parliament of the United Kingdom established in 1950
Politics of Southampton